Krzysztof Hrymowicz (born 29 December 1983 in Złotów) is a Polish footballer who currently plays as a defender.

References

External links
  

1983 births
Living people
Polish footballers
Flota Świnoujście players
Pogoń Szczecin players
Zawisza Bydgoszcz players
FC Etar 1924 Veliko Tarnovo players
Expatriate footballers in Bulgaria
First Professional Football League (Bulgaria) players
People from Złotów
Sportspeople from Greater Poland Voivodeship
Association football defenders